Marshall Walter Schacht (September 23, 1905 – November 21, 1956) was an American poet. He was born in Brookline, Massachusetts.

Life
His work appeared in Poetry Magazine, the New Yorker.

He corresponded with George Davis Snell, a college classmate, and Robert Francis.

He lived in New York City.

Awards
 Golden Rose Award
 1949 Twayne first book contest

Works

Anthology
 
 New Poets. Prairie City, Illinois: The Press of James A. Decker. 1941.

Criticism

References

External links
 The Papers of Marschall Schacht at Dartmouth College Library

1905 births
1956 deaths
20th-century American poets
Writers from Brookline, Massachusetts
Poets from Massachusetts